NSYA may refer to:

 New Syrian Army, a former Syrian rebel group
 ECY-NSYA, the leadership of Student Catholic Action